Shaun Albert Povey (born 9 August 1954) is a former South African rugby union player.

Playing career

Povey represented the Eastern Province Schools team at the 1972 annual Craven Week tournament in Potchefstroom. After school, Povey did his national service in Oudtshoorn and was selected to represent the South Western Districts under–20 side. In 1973, he spent the year at the University of Port Elizabeth, after which he moved to Stellenbosch University. He made his provincial debut for Western Province in 1977 and represented Western Province in their five winning Currie Cup finals, in 1982, 1983, 1984, 1985 and 1986.

Povey toured with the Springboks to New Zealand and the USA in 1981 as a replacement for Willie Kahts. He did not play in any test matches on tour, but played in two tour matches for the Springboks.

See also
List of South Africa national rugby union players – Springbok no. 531

References

1954 births
Living people
South African rugby union players
South Africa international rugby union players
Western Province (rugby union) players
Alumni of Grey High School
Rugby union players from Port Elizabeth
Rugby union hookers